Chrey Seima is a khum (commune) of Sampov Loun District in Battambang Province in northwestern Cambodia.

Villages

 Ou Lvea
 Spean Youl
 Reaksmei
 Kilou Prambuon
 Chambak

References

Communes of Battambang province
Sampov Loun District